The 1980 2. divisjon was a Norwegian second-tier football league season.

The league was contested by 24 teams, divided into two groups; A and B. Both groups consisted of 12 teams. The winners of group A and B were promoted to the 1981 1. divisjon. The second placed teams in group A and B met each other in a two-legged qualification round where the winner was promoted to 1. divisjon. The bottom three teams in both groups were relegated to the 3. divisjon.

HamKam won group A with 34 points. Brann won group B with 34 points. Both teams promoted to the 1981 1. divisjon. The second-placed teams, Mjøndalen and Haugar met in the promotion play-offs. Haugar defeated Mjøndalen with 4–0 on aggregate and won promotion.

Tables

Group A

Group B

Promotion play-offs

Results
Mjøndalen – Haugar 0–1
Haugar – Mjøndalen 3–0

Haugar won 4–0 on aggregate and was promoted to 1. divisjon.

References

Norwegian First Division seasons
1980 in Norwegian football
Norway
Norway